Kung fu or Chinese martial arts are a number of fighting styles that have developed over the centuries in China.

Chinese culture
Kung fu (term), means "achievement through great effort"
 Gongfu tea ceremony, also known as kung fu tea ceremony
 Kungfu (restaurant), a restaurant chain in China

Athletes
 Kung Fu (wrestler) (1951–2001), Mexican Luchador
 Kung Fu Naki, ringname for Japanese professional wrestler Shoichi Funaki

Media

Film
 Kung fu film, action films inspired by Chinese martial arts

Television
 Kung Fu (1972 TV series), a 1972–75 TV series starring David Carradine
 Kung Fu: The Legend Continues, subsequent TV series (1993–97) also starring David Carradine
 Kung Fu (2021 TV series), a modern day adaptation of the 1970s series

Music
 "Kung Fu" (Ash song), 1995
 "Kung Fu" (YBN Cordae song), 2018
 "Kung-Fu" (187 Lockdown song), 1998
 Kung Fu Records, an independent punk record label
 "Kung Fu", a 1974 song by Curtis Mayfield from the album Sweet Exorcist
 "Kung-Fu", a 2001 song by The Dirtbombs from the album Ultraglide in Black
 "Kung Fu", a 2016 song by Emeli Sandé from the album Long Live the Angels

See also
 Kung Fu Hustle, a 2004 Cantonese-language action comedy film
 "Kung Fu Fighting", a 1974 single by Carl Douglas
 Kung Fu Panda (disambiguation)
 Kung Fu (Ranking)